Thomas Hammer Schlytter Schjøth, known as Theodor Schjøth (16 April 1890 – 7 November 1932), was a Norwegian competitive rower. He was born in Zhenjiang, in the Chinese province Jiangsu. He participated in coxed four at the 1912 Summer Olympics in Stockholm.

References

1890 births
1932 deaths
People from Zhenjiang
Norwegian male rowers
Rowers at the 1912 Summer Olympics
Olympic rowers of Norway